The Barbados national tennis team represents Barbados in Davis Cup tennis competition and are governed by the Barbados Tennis Association.

History
Barbados competed in its first Davis Cup in 1990.  Barbadian players previously competed on the Caribbean/West Indies team.

In 1990, Barbados debuted in Group II of the Americas Zone (the lowest tier at that time). In 2014, they upset Mexico to advance to Group I of the Americas Zone for the first time in their history. They were relegated in 2016, but managed promotion back into Group I in 2017.

Current team (2022) 

 Darian King
 Matthew Foster-Estwick
 Kaipo Marshall
 Haydn Lewis
 Xavier Lawrence

See also
Davis Cup
Barbados Fed Cup team

External links

Davis Cup teams
Davis Cup
Davis Cup